The Golden Gloves is the name given to annual competitions for amateur boxing in the United States, where they are awarded a belt and a ring, and the title of nation's champion is awarded. The Golden Gloves is a term used to refer to the National Golden Gloves competition, but can also represent several other amateur tournaments, including regional golden gloves tournaments and other notable tournaments such as the Intercity Golden Gloves, the Chicago Golden Gloves, and the New York Golden Gloves.

History
Arch Ward, sports editor of the Chicago Tribune, came up with the idea of a citywide, Chicago amateur boxing tournament in 1923, and gained sponsorship from the Tribune in 1927. An annual tournament was held between Chicago and New York. In later years the idea was taken up by other cities, and a national tournament was held. Along with the New York Golden Gloves, the Chicago tournament was viewed as one of the two elite Golden Gloves Championships in the United States. Winners from selected states and regions headed to Chicago to meet in the Chicago Golden Gloves, while winners from other sections of the U.S. faced each other in the New York Golden Gloves tournaments. Champions from the Chicago tournament went on to face champions from the New York tournament in the Intercity Golden Gloves tournament, and thus the Intercity Golden Gloves served as the National Tournament of Champions held in the Square Garden Chicago and Chicago Stadium. The Intercity Golden Gloves tournament ran from 1928 to 1961, with the event being held at famed venues including the Chicago Coliseum.

The National Golden Gloves contest began in 1962 and continues to be the most highly regarded amateur boxing tournament in the United States. It is sponsored and controlled by the Golden Gloves Association of America, Inc. Winners from 32 regional Golden Gloves competitions, coming up in regional teams of all weight classes, compete in the national competition, called the Golden Gloves Tournament of Champions. This is held once a year, and a new tournament site is selected annually. The U.S. Golden Gloves program is currently organized on a territorial basis to give all sections of the country representation. All tournaments are planned, promoted and directed by the Golden Gloves Charities and within the limits of the amateur boxing code. Many amateur Golden Gloves participants went on to become professional boxers, including Joe Louis, Muhammad Ali, Joe Frazier, Barney Ross and Iran Barkley.

The Golden Gloves are open to all non-professional boxers aged 19–40. Citizens and non-citizens alike may compete in the tournament series. There is also a Silver Gloves amateur tournament, for amateur boxers aged 10 to 15.

Hierarchy
To compete nationally, a contender must pass through the following levels:
Sub-Franchise (Local/State) Golden Gloves
Franchise (Regional) Golden Gloves
National Golden Gloves

Golden Gloves amateur competition began in 1923 prior to the formation of Golden Gloves of America as a corporation. No unification had been undertook for a long time, as part of a tradition, different states historically had various weight class margins (171 to 178 for light heavyweight upper limit, 200 to 201 for heavyweight limit).

USA franchises
Buffalo Golden Gloves 
Chicago Golden Gloves
Cincinnati Golden Gloves
Cleveland Golden Gloves
Colorado-New Mexico Golden Gloves
Detroit Golden Gloves
Florida Golden Gloves
Hawaii Golden Gloves
Indiana Golden Gloves
Iowa Golden Gloves
Kansas City Golden Gloves
Kansas-Oklahoma Golden Gloves
Michigan Golden Gloves
Mid-South Golden Gloves
Nevada Golden Gloves
New England Golden Gloves
New Jersey Golden Gloves 
New York Metro Golden Gloves
Omaha Golden Gloves
Pennsylvania Golden Gloves
Rocky Mountain Golden Gloves
Southeast Golden Gloves
St. Louis Golden Gloves
Texas Golden Gloves
Toledo Golden Gloves
Tri-State Golden Gloves
Upper Midwest Golden Gloves
Washington, D.C. Golden Gloves
Wisconsin Golden Gloves
California Golden Gloves

Around the world
Other countries have similar amateur boxing awards, such as Mexico's Guantes De Oro (literally "Gloves of Gold" in Spanish).

Diamond Belt
In the past, certain amateur tournaments would award the victor with a Diamond Belt as recognition of their amateur championship status. These tournaments were sponsored by various organizations and newspapers in the United States, with The Philadelphia Inquirer being one of the more notable. Notable Diamond Belt winners include George Foreman, Bobby Chacon, Jimmy McCarter, Logan McElroy, and Lou Brooks.

BC Golden Gloves

The annual  Golden Gloves tournament in British Columbia, Canada, has been a regular event since 1939.
The first BC Golden Gloves champions were Alan Dunn, Bob Hickey, Eric Burnell, Henry Devine, Kenny Lindsay, Phil Vickery and Wayne Morris.

Regional and special tournaments
From time to time, there have been special tournaments or regional Golden Gloves tournaments. One that operated from 1954 to the early Sixties was the Vancouver Island Golden Gloves. The first Vancouver Island Golden Boy was Victoria's  Bert Wilkinson in 1954. Some of the history was documented in various issues of the Vancouver Island Boxing News in 1983, and the BC Amateur Boxing News between November 1983 and January 1986. A poster of the 1954 tournament and a photo of Bert Wilkinson were recently used in a video for the induction ceremony of the Greater Victoria Hall of Fame.

See also
Amateur boxing
NCAA Boxing Championship
Spanish Golden Gloves
USA Boxing

Lists of former Golden Gloves champions, by division:
List of US national Golden Gloves super heavyweight champions
List of US national Golden Gloves heavyweight champions
List of US national Golden Gloves light heavyweight champions
List of US national Golden Gloves middleweight champions
List of US national Golden Gloves light middleweight champions
List of US national Golden Gloves welterweight champions
List of US national Golden Gloves light welterweight champions
List of US national Golden Gloves lightweight champions
List of US national Golden Gloves featherweight champions
List of US national Golden Gloves bantamweight champions
List of US national Golden Gloves flyweight champions
List of US national Golden Gloves light flyweight champions

References

External links
Official website
Women's Golden Gloves
Cradle of Champions: 80 Years of the New York Daily News Golden Gloves by Bill Farrell
Times Daily - Google News Archive Search
Official Turkey website

 
Amateur boxing
Boxing in the United States
1928 establishments in the United States
Recurring sporting events established in 1928